Shady Grove is an unincorporated community in Jackson County, Tennessee, United States.

References

Unincorporated communities in Jackson County, Tennessee
Unincorporated communities in Tennessee